Regiment Algoa Bay was an infantry battalion of the South African Army. As a reserve force unit, it had a status roughly equivalent to that of a British Army Reserve or United States Army National Guard unit.

History

Artillery origins
Regiment Algoa Bay was raised in January 1946 in Port Elizabeth. The Regiment was initially intended as an artillery unit to be known as the 5th Field Regiment.  The Regiment therefore initially wore artillery badges.

Role and Name changes
By January 1960 however, the Regiment was renamed Regiment Algoa Bay and its role changed to that of mechanized infantry.
The lighthouse cap badge was adopted in 1964 and was based on the design of the Donkin Reserve lighthouse.

Amalgamation
During the latter part of 2000, Regiment Algoa Bay, Regiment Uitenhage and Donkin Regiment were amalgamated with Regiment Piet Retief. A new command team was appointed by a selection board that was convened by the Infantry Formation. Regiment Piet Retief was then also placed directly under command of the Infantry Formation.

Battle honours

Freedom of the City

Leadership

Regimental emblems

Dress Insignia

Roll of Honour

References

Infantry regiments of South Africa
Military units and formations of South Africa in the Border War
Military units and formations established in 1946
South African Army